Theodor Scheimpflug (October 7, 1865 - August 22, 1911) was an Austrian army Captain who elaborated a systematic method and apparatus for correcting perspective distortion in aerial photographs, now known as the eponymous Scheimpflug principle. He disclaimed inventing it however, citing an English patent of the early French photographic engineer Jules Carpentier.

Life
Born on October 7, 1865, in Vienna
1897 - Attended college in Vienna
Began Photographic work in 1902
Died on August 22, 1911, in Mödling

Work
Best known for his elaboration of the Scheimpflug principle, which deals with the area of critical focus in a view camera, although he was not the first to describe this principle and never claimed this to be the case.
He was also involved in aerial photography, and held several patents in that area.

See also
 Jules Carpentier

External links
Scheimpflugs Patents

References

1865 births
1911 deaths
Pioneers of photography